Runoko Rashidi (16 August 1954 – 2 August 2021) was a historian, essayist, author and public lecturer based in Los Angeles, California, and Paris, France. He is the author of Introduction to the Study of African Classical Civilizations] (1993) and the editor of Unchained African Voices, a collection of poetry and prose by Death Row inmates at California's San Quentin maximum-security prison. He was a member of the editorial board of Africology: The Journal of Pan African Studies (www.jpanafrican.org), and he held an honorary doctorate of divinity from Amen-Ra Theological Seminary (Los Angeles, California). He also supported the work of controversial scholars like the late Ivan Van Sertima.

Scope of work
Rashidi was a writer and speaker who lectured on ancient Egypt, his belief in an African presence in prehistoric America, Africans in antiquity, and the African presence in Asia and other parts of the world.

Activities
He is the author or editor of 18 books, including The African Presence in Early Asia (1985, 1988, 1995), with Ivan Van Sertima, Black Star: The African Presence in Early Europe (2012) and African Star over Asia: The Black Presence in the East (2013).

He died on August 2, 2021, while on a tour of Egypt.

See also 
Afrocentricity/Afrocentrism
Pan Africanism
Martin Bernal
John Henrik Clarke
John G. Jackson (writer)

References

Further reading
Van Sertima, Ivan (1989). Egypt Revisited. Transaction Publishers.

External links
 Official website
 Articles by Rashidi, The Global African Presence Website (personal website)

1954 births
2021 deaths
People from Los Angeles
African-American non-fiction writers
20th-century American historians
21st-century American historians
Historians of Africa
Afrocentrists
American Africanists
American pan-Africanists
Pseudohistorians
20th-century American male writers
21st-century American male writers
20th-century African-American writers
21st-century African-American writers
African-American male writers